Sovereign Seamount is a seamount near the Midway Atoll and the Northampton Seamounts.

References 

Seamounts of the Pacific Ocean